Hamidul Rahman is an Indian politician who has won two terms as a member of the West Bengal Legislative Assembly.

Rahman won the Chopra seat in Uttar Dinajpur as an independent candidate in the 2001 election. As an Indian National Congress candidate he lost the same seat in 2006.

In the eventful 2011 elections, which the Congress fought in alliance with Trinamool Congress, the Chopra seat was allotted to Trinamool Congress. However, Rahman contested as an independent candidate and won the seat. In fact, of the 18 rebel Congress candidates who fought elections throughout West Bengal, Rahman was the only winner.

Rahman was initially suspended by the Congress for contesting against the alliance candidate, but was soon taken back into the Congress by his political mentor, Deepa Dasmunsi. Rahman is alleged to have been involved in post-poll violence. Subsequently, Rahman joined Trinamool Congress.

References 

 

Living people
West Bengal MLAs 2001–2006
West Bengal MLAs 2011–2016
West Bengal MLAs 2016–2021
People from Uttar Dinajpur district
Indian National Congress politicians
Year of birth missing (living people)
Trinamool Congress politicians from West Bengal
20th-century Bengalis
21st-century Bengalis